The Marrah Mountains or Marra Mountains (Fur, Fugo Marra; , Jebel Marra are a range of volcanic peaks in a massif that rises up to . They are the highest mountains in Sudan.

Geography

The mountains are located in the center of the Darfur region of Sudan on the border of the states of South Darfur and Central Darfur, with a smaller part of the range in the state of North Darfur. The highest point is Deriba Caldera. The upper reaches of the massif is a small area of temperate climate with high rainfall and permanent springs of water amidst the dry savanna and scrub of the Sahel below.

The last eruption occurred around 1500 BC.

The vegetation was described by Gerald Wickens.

History 
In course of the War in Darfur, the Marrah Mountains fell under control of the rebel Sudan Liberation Movement/Army faction loyal to Abdul Wahid al Nur. The mountains remained one of the group's most important strongholds, housing several of its bases, as of 2021.

Footnotes

References 

 
Mountain ranges of Sudan
Volcanoes of Sudan
Volcanic fields
Sahel
Darfur